Common names: Mauritius snakes, Round Island boas, splitjaw snakes.
The Bolyeriidae are a family of snakes native to Mauritius and a few islands around it, especially Round Island. They also used to be found on the island of Mauritius, but were extirpated there due to human influence and foraging pigs in particular. These snakes used to be placed in the Boidae, but are now classed as a separate family. Two monotypic genera are recognized, but only a single species is extant. Bolyeriidae appear to be most closely related to the Asian genus Xenophidion.

Geographic range
Found in Mauritius.

Genera

T) Type genus.

Both of these monotypic genera once inhabited Mauritius and/or a number of islands around it. However, Bolyeria hasn't been reported since 1975 and is believed to be extinct, while Casarea is known to survive only on Round Island.

References

Further reading
 
Hoffstetter R (1946). "Remarques sur la classification des Ophidiens et particulièrement des Boides des Mascareignes (Boylerinae subfam. nov.)". Bulletin du Muséum National d'Histoire Naturelle, Series 2, 18 (1): 132-135. (in French).

External links
 Bolyeriids at Life is Short, but Snakes are Long.

 
Reptiles of Mauritius
Endemic fauna of Mauritius
Taxa named by Robert Hoffstetter
Snake families